The Ocean (also known as the Ocean Collective) is a German progressive metal band started in 2000 by German guitarist Robin Staps. Loïc Rossetti has been the band's vocalist since the 2010 albums Heliocentric and Anthropocentric.

History 
The Ocean was founded in 2000 by guitarist and songwriter Robin Staps. During the following two years, about 40 musicians joined and left the band until a stable line-up was established. July 2002 saw The Ocean play their first concert at Berlin's now defunct semi-legal Eimer Club. Shortly after, the band released their eponymous demo Islands/Tides, a 30-minute-long song that also constituted the substance of their early live shows.

After a brief tour with Swedish crust punk outfit Coma in early 2003, the band signed to Make My Day Records, which then released their debut album Fogdiver on 1 September 2003; consisting of five songs, this is a instrumental record, despite the fact that on stage at least two singers could be found. Unlike its predecessor, this recording received considerable acclaim from critics throughout a variety of genres.

During winter and spring 2004, The Ocean recorded what was to become the material for their two following albums. The calmer and more atmospheric half of this recording session was released as Fluxion in August 2004; a joint effort of Make My Day and Throne Records. While the addition of vocalist Meta seemed to make the music more accessible to some, it also caused many other critics to consider the album a step backwards in terms of innovation and originality compared to the instrumental Fogdiver. In interviews, the band would comment on this by pointing out the perceived closed-mindedness of some of the reviewers and their supposed inability to deal with the harshness and brutality the anti-Christian, anti-theistic vocals now added to The Ocean's sound.

After signing to Metal Blade Records in summer 2005, all the remaining songs from the session were released as Aeolian. Since Fluxion and Aeolian had originally been planned as a double CD with a mellow and a brutal part — a plan that did not work out — Aeolian came across as very different from its predecessor. Unlike on previous albums, classical instruments and electronic sounds were hardly used here, making the record sound rather minimalistic. But whereas Fluxion had featured only one singer, seven of them could be found on Aeolian, among them Nate Newton, Sean Ingram, and Tomas Hallbom, whose names were also used extensively for the album's promotion campaign. According to the band, Meta's voice on Fluxion had created a monotony that was to be avoided on Aeolian, which also resulted in the addition of second vocalist Nico Webers. March 2006 saw the North American release of the album. Later that year, a joint vinyl version of Fluxion and Aeolian was released by Throne Records, featuring three records in different colors. During this time, vocalist Meta left the band and was replaced by Mike Pilat.

In late 2007, they released a new 2 disc album entitled Precambrian. A few months later Nico Webers left to join War From A Harlots Mouth, leaving Mike Pilat as the band's sole vocalist. In April 2008, The Ocean embarked on a year-long tour through Europe and North America with bands like Intronaut, Opeth, and At The Gates. In April 2009 it was announced that lead vocalist Mike Pilat was leaving the band for personal reasons and other commitments.

On 17 November 2009, Robin Staps announced that a replacement vocalist had been found, Loïc Rossetti. The Ocean released two albums in 2010, Heliocentric on 9 April and Anthropocentric on 9 November. Taken together, the two albums "represent a fundamental and philosophical critique of Christianity," with Heliocentric describing the internal battles within the Catholic Church over the heliocentrism of Copernicus and Galileo, and Anthropocentric critiquing the fundamentalist Protestant view of Creationism.

They announced that their first live DVD would be filmed on 29 January 2011 in Berlin at the Museum für Musikinstrumente and will only contain tracks from their album Precambrian. On 3 August 2011, The Ocean announced via its Facebook page that Robin Staps had been working on new material for an upcoming album. They stated that recording would get under way in early 2012 and hinted at the possibility of releasing another double album. In a September 2012 article on the website MetalSucks, Robin stated that the new album was due for an April or May release in 2013 and would have very few if any vocals, but elaborated that Loïc remains the vocalist of the group despite the change in style.

The band released Pelagial on 29 April 2013 in the United States. The CD version contained two discs - one has the songs with vocals, the other is purely instrumental. On 20 October 2013, the band announced the departure of guitarist Jonathan Nido and drummer Luc Hess. It was later announced that Paul Seidel of the band War From A Harlots Mouth would replace Hess after the current tour. Additionally, on 8 December it was announced via the band's Facebook page that Australian Damian Murdoch would be the band's new guitarist.

On 14 February 2018, a photo was posted on the Instagram account of the band, depicting a recording studio. Three days later, another picture reached the surface stating that the "phanerozoic" recordings are in progress at the Sundlaugin studios in Iceland. 22 August 2018, the band announced on their Instagram, that the new album will be split in two. Phanerozoic I: Palaeozoic was released on 2 November 2018 while Phanerozoic II was expected to be released in 2019, but was postponed to 2020. These albums will respectively be the band's seventh and eighth studio albums, and are the conceptual successors to the album Precambrian. In November 2019 the band was quoted to be "wrapping up recording and will begin mixing at Fascination Street Studios in December". They announced that the album name would Phanerozoic II: Mesozoic & Cenozoic, which started speculations that it might be a double album. These rumors proved false, and Phanerozoic II: Mesozoic & Cenozoic was released 25 September 2020.

On 21 September 2020, the fossil ophiacantha oceani was named in honor of the band.

Musical style
Their musical style has been described by different sources as progressive metal, post-metal, sludge metal, extreme metal, and avant-garde metal.

Members 

The Ocean has had many different line-ups since its inception in 2000. Sometimes the band is known as The Ocean Collective as it features a revolving cast of members and (long-time) collaborators, centered around guitarist and composer Robin Staps.

Current
 Robin Staps – guitar, programming, backing vocals (2000–present)
 Loïc Rossetti – lead vocals (2009–present)
 Paul Seidel – drums, backing vocals (2013–present)
 Mattias Hägerstrand – bass (2015–present)
 David Ramis Åhfeldt – guitar (2018–present)
 Peter Voigtmann – synths (2018–present)

Timeline

Discography

Studio albums
 Fogdiver (instrumental mini-album) (2003)
 Fluxion (2004)
 Aeolian (2006)
 Precambrian (2007)
 Heliocentric (2010)
 Anthropocentric (2010)
 Pelagial (2013)
 Phanerozoic I: Palaeozoic (2018)
 Phanerozoic II: Mesozoic / Cenozoic (2020)
 Holocene (2023)

Other releases
 Islands/Tides (demo, 2002)
 Burst/The Ocean (7" split, 2005)
 The Grand Inquisitor (10" EP, 2012)
 Transcendental (split EP, 2015)

Music videos

References

External links
 Official band site
 Interview in SHOUT! Music Webzine
 Interview on MetalhertzFM.com
 Last.fm page for The Ocean

Post-metal musical groups
German progressive metal musical groups
Sludge metal musical groups
Avant-garde metal musical groups
German musical groups
German heavy metal musical groups
Musical groups from Berlin
Musical groups established in 2000
Metal Blade Records artists